Pierre Chesneau (born 10 April 1902, date of death unknown) was a French footballer. He played in one match for the France national football team in 1924.

References

External links
 

1902 births
Year of death missing
French footballers
France international footballers
Place of birth missing
Association football forwards
Footballers at the 1920 Summer Olympics
Footballers at the 1924 Summer Olympics
Olympic footballers of France